Oberiberg is a village and municipality in Schwyz District in the canton of Schwyz in Switzerland. The municipality comprises the village of Oberiberg and the hamlet and ski area of Hoch-Ybrig.

History
Oberiberg is first mentioned around 1217-22 as Yberge.  Until the separation, in 1884, into Unteriberg and Oberiberg the independent municipality was known simply as Iberg.

Geography

Of this area, 50.2% is used for agricultural purposes, while 39.1% is forested. Of the rest of the land, 1.9% is settled (buildings or roads) and the remainder (8.8%) is non-productive (rivers, glaciers or mountains).

It consists of the village of Oberiberg and the hamlet of Hoch-Ybrig.

Demographics
, 7.1% of the population was made up of foreign nationals. Over the last 10 years the population has grown at a rate of 4.7%. Most of the population speaks German  (98.2%), with Portuguese being second most common ( 0.4%) and Albanian being third ( 0.3%).

 the gender distribution of the population was 51.7% male and 48.3% female.  The age distribution, in Oberiberg is; 150 people or 20.9% of the population is between 0 and 19.  189 people or 26.3% are 20 to 39, and 260 people or 36.2% are 40 to 64.  The senior population distribution is 61 people or 8.5% are 65 to 74.  There are 54 people or 7.5% who are 70 to 79 and 4 people or 0.56% of the population who are over 80.

 there are 296 households, of which 89 households (or about 30.1%) contain only a single individual.  22 or about 7.4% are large households, with at least five members.

In the 2007 election the most popular party was the SVP which received 62.1% of the vote.  The next three most popular parties were the CVP (19.1%), the SPS (8.6%) and the FDP (7.2%).

In Oberiberg about 56.6% of the population (between age 25-64) have completed either non-mandatory upper secondary education or additional higher education (either university or a Fachhochschule).

Oberiberg has an unemployment rate of 0.8%.  , there were 98 people employed in the primary economic sector and about 41 businesses involved in this sector.  41 people are employed in the secondary sector and there are 11 businesses in this sector.  134 people are employed in the tertiary sector, with 49 businesses in this sector.

Of the rest of the population, there are 5 individuals (or about 0.70% of the population) who belong to the Orthodox Church. There are less than 5 individuals who are Islamic. 33 (or about 4.60% of the population) belong to no church, are agnostic or atheist, and 24 individuals (or about 3.34% of the population) did not answer the question.

The historical population is given in the following table:

Weather
Oberiberg has an average of 163.6 days of rain per year and on average receives  of precipitation. During this month there is precipitation for an average of 15.4 days. The month with the most days of precipitation is June, with an average of 16.5, but with only  of precipitation.

References

External links

Municipalities of the canton of Schwyz